Sellaperumal Ramalingam is an Indian politician belonging to the Dravida Munnetra Kazhagam.He was elected to the Lok Sabha, the lower house of the Parliament of India from Mayiladuthurai, Tamil Nadu in the 2019 Indian general election. He was earlier elected four times to the Tamil Nadu legislative assembly from Thiruvidamarudur constituency  in 1977, 1980, 1989 and 1996 elections.

References

External links
 Official biographical sketch in Parliament of India website

Dravida Munnetra Kazhagam politicians
Living people
People from Thanjavur district
Tamil Nadu MLAs 1996–2001
1945 births
India MPs 2019–present
Tamil Nadu MLAs 1977–1980
Tamil Nadu MLAs 1980–1984
Tamil Nadu MLAs 1989–1991